The Shire of Yea was a local government area about  northeast of Melbourne, the state capital of Victoria, Australia. The shire's population was dominated by the town of Yea.

History

Yea was first incorporated as a road district on 1 February 1869, and became a shire on 28 November 1873.

Its boundaries changed a number of times throughout its existence:
 15 May 1907 - Annexed parts of the Shire of Seymour.
 20 May 1914 - Lost a part of North Riding to the Shire of Alexandra.
 21 April 1925 - Lost parts to the Shire of Healesville.
 19 April 1961 - Lost parts to the Shire of Seymour.
 1 October 1972 - Annexed parts of the Shire of Eltham, near Kinglake.
 1 October 1980 - Annexed parts of the Shire of Healesville.

The Shire was described in the 1949 Australian Blue Book as an elevated area given to pastoral and dairying pursuits, along with sheep and cattle grazing. By 1994, 51% of Yea's land was under cultivation as farmland, with the Kinglake National Park and Yea River Regional Park, as well as the Murrindindi Forest, the latter being important to Yea's economy for timber production, accounting for much of the rest.

On 18 November 1994, the Shire of Yea was abolished, and along with the Shire of Alexandra and parts of the City of Whittlesea and the Shires of Broadford, Eltham, Euroa and Healesville, was merged into the newly created Shire of Murrindindi.

Ridings

Yea's ridings were abolished on 27 May 1930, and all councillors represented the entire shire.

Towns and localities

 Break O'Day
 Caveat
 Cheviot
 Devlins Bridge
 Dropmore
 Flowerdale
 Ghin Ghin
 Glenburn
 Hazeldene
 Highlands
 Homewood
 Kerrisdale
 Kinglake (shared with the Shire of Eltham)
 Limestone
 Molesworth
 Murrindindi
 Woodbourne
 Yea*

* Council seat.

Population

* Estimate in the 1958 Victorian Year Book.

References

External links
 Victorian Places - Yea and Yea Shire

Yea